= Berliner Lebensqualitätsprofil =

- Purpose: assessment of subjective quality of life

The Berliner Lebensqualitätsprofil (BELP) is an assessment of subjective quality of life. It is the German version of the Lancashire Quality of Life Profile.

In this test the subjective quality of life is rated as satisfaction in general and in different areas; social-relations, leisure, work, finances, living situation, family and security.

There is also a short version of this test, the BELP-KF.
